"The Flower and the Young Man" is a song by English band Strawbs written by Dave Cousins. The track first appeared on the Grave New World album.

Lyrical and musical content

The lyrics are a veiled reference to a love affair which Dave Cousins had had but did not want to reveal for risk of upsetting his family. The music features the clavioline, an early predecessor of the synthesizer.

The song starts with an a cappella verse, followed by a verse sung by Tony Hooper. The chorus parts of the song are instrumental, featuring a heavy use of keyboards. The final verse is similar to the a cappella verse but with harmonium backing.

Personnel

Dave Cousins – backing vocals, acoustic guitar
Tony Hooper – lead vocals, acoustic guitar
Blue Weaver – Hammond organ, Mellotron, Clavioline, harmonium
John Ford – backing vocals, bass guitar
Richard Hudson – backing vocals, drums

External links
 Lyrics to "The Flower and the Young Man" at Strawbsweb

References

Sleeve notes to album CD 540 934-2 Grave New World (A&M 1998 Remastered)
Grave New World 30th anniversary article on Strawbsweb

Strawbs songs
1971 songs
Songs written by Dave Cousins